The Mercedes-Benz Vision CLS is a concept vehicle with a six-cylinder twin turbo diesel engine rated at 265 PS (195 kW; 261 hp) and 560 N·m (413 lb·ft), 7G-TRONIC seven-speed automatic transmission, Active Light System from Mercedes-Benz E-Class (W211), electrohydraulic brake system from Mercedes-Benz SL (R 230), dashboard and A-pillars upholstered in leather, soft leather upholstery on seats and door panels, oak veneer, glass roof, 470 litres of boot capacity, adaptive front airbags, window bags and side airbags, belt tensioners with adaptive belt force limiters.

The vehicle was unveiled at the 2003 Frankfurt International Motor Show IAA. It was a preview of the Mercedes-Benz CLS-Class (C219).

References 

Vision CLS